The Territorial Prelature of Santiago Apóstol de Huancané is a Roman Catholic territorial prelature located in the city of Huancané in the Ecclesiastical province of Arequipa in Peru.

History
On 3 April 2019, the Territorial Prelature of Santiago Apóstol de Huancané was established from the Roman Catholic Territorial Prelature of Ayaviri and Roman Catholic Territorial Prelature of Juli.

Ordinaries
 Prelates of Santiago Apóstol de Huancané (Roman rite)
Giovanni Cefai, M.S.S.P. (3 April 2019 – present)

References
 Catholic Hierarchy

Roman Catholic dioceses in Peru
Roman Catholic Ecclesiastical Province of Arequipa
Christian organizations established in 2019
Roman Catholic dioceses and prelatures established in the 21st century
Territorial prelatures